is a Japanese chemist, engineer, and Professor Emeritus at the University of Tsukuba and Zhejiang University. He is best known for his discovery of conductive polymers. He was co-recipient of the 2000 Nobel Prize in Chemistry jointly with Alan MacDiarmid and Alan Heeger.

Early life and education 

Hideki Shirakawa was born in Tokyo, Japan, the second son of a military doctor. He had one elder and one younger brother and sister. Olympic marathoner champion Naoko Takahashi is his second cousin-niece. He lived in Manchukuo and Taiwan during childhood. Around third grade, he moved to Takayama, Gifu, which is the hometown of his mother.

Shirakawa graduated from Tokyo Institute of Technology (Tokyo Tech) with a bachelor's degree in chemical engineering in 1961, and his doctorate in 1966. Afterward, he obtained the post of assistant in Chemical Resources Laboratory at Tokyo Tech.

Career 

While employed as an assistant at Tokyo Institute of Technology (Tokyo Tech) in Japan, Shirakawa developed polyacetylene, which has a metallic appearance. This result interested Alan MacDiarmid when MacDiarmid visited Tokyo Tech in 1975.

In 1976, he was invited to work in the laboratory of Alan MacDiarmid as a post-doctoral fellow at the University of Pennsylvania. The two developed the electrical conductivity of polyacetylene along with American physicist Alan Heeger.

In 1977 they discovered that doping with iodine vapor could enhance the conductivity of polyacetylene. The three scientists were awarded the Nobel Prize in Chemistry in 2000 in recognition of the discovery. With regard to the mechanism of electric conduction, it is strongly believed that nonlinear excitations in the form of solitons play a role.

In 1979, Shirakawa became an assistant professor in the University of Tsukuba; three years later, he advanced to a full professor. In 1991 he was appointed as Tsukuba's Chief of Science and Engineering Department of Graduate School (until March, 1993), and as Tsukuba's Chief of Category #3 group (until March, 1997).

Nobel Prize 
Shirakawa was awarded the 2000 Nobel Prize in Chemistry together with UPenn's physics professor Alan J. Heeger and chemistry professor Alan G. MacDiarmid, "for the discovery and development of conductive polymers". He also became the first Japanese Nobel laureate who did not graduate from one of the National Seven Universities and the second Japanese chemistry Nobel laureate.

Over the years, Shirakawa has expressed that he does not want the Nobel Prizes to receive too much special treatment from mass media (especially the Japanese media). He hopes that many vital areas in fields outside the Nobel Prize categories will also become more widely known.

Research 
Shirakawa's research on conductive polymers can be broken down into four main categories: polyacetylene thin film synthesis, the causation of metallic conductivity due to chemical doping, the creation of conjugated (double or triple bonds in a molecule which are separated by a single bond) liquid crystalline polymers, and acetylene polymerization development that used liquid crystals as solvents.

 Polyacetylene Synthesis: Polyacetylene was expected to have certain properties, with insolubility making the substance difficult to work with. Dr. Shirakawa found that polyacetylene thin films can be synthesized, and with the thin films, the doctor clarified the molecular and solidified structures of polyacetylene.
 Creation of Metallic Conductivity: Dr. Shirakawa found that, when a trace of a halogen such as bromine or iodine is added to thin film polyacetylene, its electric conductivity increases, and it exhibits metallic conductivity. Shirakawa found that partial electron transfer between dopants and p-electrons of polyacetylene can generate metallic conductivity.
 Using Liquid Crystals to Develop Acetylene Polymerization: Dr. Shirakawa developed a method for the production of highly conductive polyacetylene thin films which paralleled the polymerization of acetylene. Furthermore, he succeeded in the synthesis of thin films of helical polyacetylene whose chirality is controllable.
 Chirality: a property of asymmetry, meaning a molecule is distinguishable from its mirror image; that is, it cannot be superimposed onto it

4. Creation of Conjugated Liquid Crystalline Polymers: Dr. Shirakawa created self-oriented, conjugated liquid crystalline polymers by introducing liquid crystalline groups into the side chains of p-conjugated polymers such as polyacetylene. He also macroscopically oriented the polymers with electric or magnetic fields and succeeded in having the molecules electric anisotropy.

-The general definition of electrical anisotropy describes the variation of an electrical property depending on the lateral or vertical direction (x,y,z) in which a current flows.

Recognition 
1983 – The Award of the Society of Polymer Science, Japan
2000 – SPSJ Award for Outstanding Achievement in Polymer Science and Technology
2000 – Nobel Prize in Chemistry
2000 – Order of Culture and selected as Person of Cultural Merit
2000 – Professor Emeritus of the University of Tsukuba
2001 – Special Award of the Chemical Society of Japan
2001 – Member of the Japan Academy
2006 – Professor Emeritus of the Zhejiang University

Relatives 
One of his relatives, Hitomi Yoshizawa, is a member of the singing group Morning Musume Morning Girls. He is also related to Naoko Takahashi, the women's marathon gold medalist of the 2000 Summer Olympics.

Public issues 
On 6 December 2013, the House of Councillors (Japan) approved the bill of the State Secrecy Law. Shirakawa and physics Nobel laureate Toshihide Maskawa issued a statement saying that the law:
"threatens the pacifist principles and fundamental human rights established by the constitution and should be rejected immediately...(omitted)...Even in difficult times, protecting the freedom of the press, of thought and expression and of academic research is indispensable."

See also

 List of Japanese Nobel laureates

Notes

References
 Biographical snapshots: Hideki Shirakawa , Journal of Chemical Education web site.

Dr. Shirakawa Hideki. Dr. SHIRAKAWA Hideki - University of Tsukuba. (n.d.). Retrieved December 9, 2022, from https://www.tsukuba.ac.jp/en/about/history/nobel/shirakawa/

External links 
  Nobel Lecture on 8 December 2000 The Discovery of Polyacetylene Film: The Dawning of an Era of Conducting Polymers
Official Homepage in Japanese

1936 births
Living people
Polymer scientists and engineers
Japanese scientists
Japanese Nobel laureates
Nobel laureates in Chemistry
People from Gifu Prefecture
Recipients of the Order of Culture
Tokyo Institute of Technology alumni
Academic staff of the University of Tsukuba